Channel 44 may refer to several television stations:

Australia
Community television in Australia, various  stations operating on digital channel 44
 Channel 44 (Adelaide), a community television station in Adelaide, South Australia
 C31 Melbourne, Melbourne, Victoria
 Hitchhike TV, Brisbane, Queensland (defunct)
 West TV, Perth, Western Australia (defunct)

Bahrain
 Channel 44 (Bahrain), a public television station; see Television in Bahrain

Canada
The following television stations operate on virtual channel 44 in Canada:
 CFTF-DT-11 in Carleton-sur-Mer, Quebec

Mexico
The following television stations operate on virtual channel 44 in Mexico:
XHIJ-TDT in Ciudad Juárez, Chihuahua
XHICCH-TDT in Chihuahua, Chihuahua
XHUDG-TDT in Guadalajara, Jalisco
XHPBGZ-TDT in Ciudad Guzmán, Jalisco
XHPBLM-TDT in Lagos de Moreno, Jalisco
XHCPAF-TDT in Puerto Vallarta, Jalisco
XHFZC-TDT in Zacatecas, Zacatecas

United States
The following television stations, which are no longer broadcasting, formerly branded themselves as channel 44:
 Miami Valley Channel (UPN 44), a cable-only station in Dayton, Ohio

See also
 Channel 44 virtual TV stations in the United States
For UHF frequencies covering 650-656 MHz:
 Channel 44 TV stations in Canada
 Channel 44 digital TV stations in the United States
 Channel 44 low-power TV stations in the United States

44